Hilal bin Ali bin Hilal Al-Sabti (Arabic:  معالي الدكتور هلال بن علي بن هلال السبتي) was born on October 27, 1972. On June 16, 2022, His Majesty Sultan Haitham Bin Tariq has issued a Royal Decree appointing Dr. Hilal bin Ali bin Hilal Al Sabti, as the new Minister of Health.  He succeeded His Excellency Dr. Ahmed Al Saidi on this new role.

Prior to becoming the Minister of Health, Dr. Al Sabti served as the Executive President of Oman Medical Specialty Board (OMSB), from May 2015 to June 2022, under Royal Decree No. 24/2015.  Hilal is a Senior Consultant Cardiothoracic Surgeon at Sultan Qaboos University Hospital (SQUH).

Surgical career
In 2014, the first artificial heart transplantation procedure in the Sultanate was done by a cardiac surgery team led by Al Sabti, for a patient suffering from heart failure. In April 2015, a cardiac surgery team of Sultan Qaboos University Hospital has managed to plant a valve inside a valve in the aorta and mitral valves through a catheter.  A first-of-its-kind surgery in the world done on a pregnant woman.  The cardiac surgery team was led by Al Sabti.  Dr. Hilal contributed in the first Thoracab procedure done in Oman and Middle East.  In 2013 a team of cardiac surgeons, under the leadership of Dr. Hilal, and cardiac anesthetists at Sultan Qaboos University Hospital, successfully conducted TAVI procedures to four patients aged over 75 years.

Recently, an operation was carried out by the SQUH medical team of surgeons headed by Dr. Hilal Al Sabti.  The patient, who is a mother of three, was suffering from a rare heart condition known as automatic coronary dissection, which disease affects the coronary arteries of the heart and occurs more often in women under the age of 50 years. The woman was having elevated heart enzymes and the dissection in coronary arteries are expanding to the branch arteries. The surgical team successfully performed an operation by replacing three arteries in the heart. The procedure was accompanied by the use of a new technique that demonstrated the advanced skills of the surgical team.  A medical team at Sultan Qaboos University Hospital has managed to save the patient's life.  SQUH added that “The surgery will be documented and published as a scientific paper in a refereed international scientific journal, so that the benefit is widespread among specialists in cardiothoracic surgery around the world,”.

Honours
Dr. Al Sabti was blessed by His Majesty Sultan Qaboos bin Said, to be honoured with GCC Medal in Civil Service and Administrative Development, on May 1, 2019.  He was also conferred by His Majesty Sultan Qaboos Bin Said, the Oman Civil Order (3rd class) in November 2015 along with other Excellencies, in appreciation to their active role in performing national duties.  Dr. Hilal was also conferred an Honorary Fellowship by the College of Anaesthesiologists of Ireland in May 2019.

Service in Medical Education
Dr. Al Sabti held the post of Deputy Director-General for Clinical Affairs at Sultan Qaboos University Hospital from 2010 to 2013, strengthening the University Hospital’s liaison with other international universities for training, education and research. He was a patron of the establishment of the first Hybrid Operating room in Oman in Sultan Qaboos University. Dr. Al Sabti is involved in various charity projects, educational talks, health awareness campaigns, and participation in Ministry of Health, SQUH, and OMSB Committees. He is a member of international and local associations.

Publications
In scholarly activities, Dr. Al Sabti has numerous publications in peer-reviewed journals. His research works are reflected in his Google Scholar, ResearchGate and PubMed Direct accounts.  The intent to continuously publish is enhanced by his collaboration with various local and international research groups.

Executive President
Oman Medical Specialty Board described Dr. Al Sabti as an innovative and visionary leader, an agent of change and opportunities, who has a documented track record of accomplishments and the aspirations to improve the quality of health care in the Sultanate. OMSB was led to achieving various major Milestones:
 ISO certification for quality in July 2015
 ACGME-I Institutional accreditation
 ACGME-I Accreditation for 16 out of 18 residency programs in two years span
 Secured 50 to 70 postgraduate scholarships for physicians of clinical specialties annually
 Established rare medical specialties track to encourage Omanis to get involved in building up less-engaging specialties into high demands
 Preparing physicians, nurses and pharmacists to get training abroad for the Sultan Qaboos Cancer Center 
 Incorporating simulation in the curriculum of the training programs
 Establishment of local Certifying Specialty Board Examinations - OMSB Part I and Part II Examinations
 Reengineering of the processes in the organization in collaboration with international firm, for quality management system
 Restructured Oman Medical Specialty Board through proficient leadership
 Digitalized various services and processes
 Consolidating OMSB Wellness and Performance Unit to assist trainees and trainers for any stress or psychological matters
 Establishment of a new strategic plan 2040 with short term plan 2017-2020 to match the government planning
 Establishment of HAKEEM, a Physician Database System
 Establishment of E-learning platform for all Healthcare Professionals
 Graduating numerous specialists in all branches of medicine locally and internationally, to serve the Oman Healthcare sectors
 Initiated the accreditation of local Fellowship Programs

Early life
Dr. Al Sabti earned his MD degree from Sultan Qaboos University (SQU), Muscat, Oman and did his General Surgery Residency in the same university.  He completed his residency training in Cardiac Surgery at McGill University, Canada while obtaining a Master of Science degree in Experimental Surgery.  He obtained his Board certification in Cardiac Surgery from the Royal College of Physicians and Surgeons of Canada in 2005.  He continued his professional development through a Fellowship in Minimal Invasive Cardiac Surgery at Hamburg Eppendorf University Hospital, Germany.  Dr. Al Sabti was the First Omani to attend Leadership for Physician executive's course in Harvard Medical School in 2009; and the first Omani physician to attend  the  Oxford  University  Strategic  Leadership  Program  in  November  2013. Dr. Al Sabti pioneered the establishment of Cardiothoracic Surgery Division in Sultan Qaboos University Hospital – established in 2006.

As a student, Dr. Al Sabti received numerous awards, one of which is the National/International Research Award in Fraser Gurd Surgical Day, 2nd Prize for the Residents Presentations in Research in McGill University 2002.  He also received "Best Resident Teacher Award" in Cardiac Surgery for 2005 in McGill University, Canada; as well as "Best Student Award" in 1995 from the Department of Pharmacology, Sultan Qaboos University, Oman.

References 

Omani cardiac surgeons
Thoracic surgeons
1972 births
Living people
Sultan Qaboos University alumni
McGill University Faculty of Medicine alumni
21st-century Omani people